Predicate or predication may refer to:
 Predicate (grammar), in linguistics
 Predication (philosophy)
 several closely related uses in mathematics and formal logic:
Predicate (mathematical logic)
Propositional function
Finitary relation, or n-ary predicate
Boolean-valued function
Syntactic predicate, in formal grammars and parsers
Functional predicate
Predication (computer architecture)
in United States law, the basis or foundation of something
Predicate crime
Predicate rules, in the U.S. Title 21 CFR Part 11
 Predicate, a term used in some European context for either nobles' honorifics or for nobiliary particles

See also 
 Predicate logic